Window to Paris is a 1993 Russian comedic drama film directed by Yuri Mamin.

Plot 
In the film, which is set in the 1990s, a magical portal connecting Saint Petersburg with Paris is discovered. The main character, Nikolai Chizhov, is a school music teacher and a member of the Russian intelligentsia.

Reception 
Mamin considered it unfair that the film was not chosen as the official Russian submission for the 1994 Academy Award for Best International Feature Film, asserting that this was due to the personal and political influence of Nikita Mikhalkov.

References

External links 

1990s fantasy comedy-drama films
Films about immigration
Films set in 1992
Films set in Saint Petersburg
Films set in Paris
Films shot in Saint Petersburg
Films shot in Paris
Magic realism films
French fantasy comedy-drama films
Russian fantasy comedy-drama films
Russian multilingual films
1993 comedy films
1993 films
1993 drama films
1990s French films